The Signal Battalion "Legnano" is a signals unit of the Italian Army based in Avellino in Campania. Formed in 1935 and assigned to the 102nd Motorized Division "Trento" the battalion participated during World War II in the Western Desert Campaign and Tunisian Campaign. After the battalion surrendered to the allies in May 1943 it was reformed by the Italian Co-belligerent Army in November 1943. The battalion participated in the Italian Campaign on the allied side and after the war was assigned to the Infantry Division "Legnano". In 1975 the battalion was disbanded. In 2004 the 232nd Signal Regiment was formed with the Battalion "Legnano" as its signal battalion.

History

World War II 

On 15 July 1935 the regimental depot of the 4th Engineer Regiment in Trento formed the LI Mixed Engineer Battalion for the 32nd Motorized Division "Trento", which deployed to Libya from December 1935 to August 1936 during the Second Italo-Ethiopian War. The Trento served in the Western Desert Campaign, until it was destroyed in the Second Battle of El Alamein. The LI Mixed Engineer Battalion suffered heavy losses in the battle and was later filled up with the survivors of other destroyed engineer units. During the Tunisian Campaign the battalion was attached first to the 27th Infantry Division "Brescia" and then the 16th Infantry Division "Pistoia". The battalion surrendered to the allies on 13 May 1943.

On 13 November 1943 the LI Mixed Engineer Battalion was reformed in Colli a Volturno by the Italian Co-belligerent Army. The battalion consisted of a command, the 51st Teleradio Company, and the 51st Engineer Company, which had been formed on 27 September 1943 in San Pietro Vernotico. The battalion was assigned to the I Motorized Grouping and from 22 March 1944 to the Italian Liberation Corps, which was reorganized as Combat Group "Legnano" on 30 September 1944. After joining the combat group the battalion was augmented with the 3rd Engineer Company. For its service during the Italian Campaign the battalion was awarded a Silver Medal of Military Valour.

Cold War 

After World War II the battalion was based in Bergamo and remained assigned to the Legano, which was expanded to Infantry Division "Legnano". The battalion consisted of a command, the 3rd and 51st engineer companies, the 51st Teleradio Company, and the 3rd Field Park Company. On 1 December 1946 the battalion was split to form the Engineer Battalion "Legnano" in Pavia and the Connections Battalion "Legnano" in Bergamo.

The battalion consisted of a command, a command platoon, and three connections companies - one for division headquarter, one for infantry regiment, and one for artillery regiment. On 1 October 1952 the Connections Speciality became an autonomous speciality of the Engineer Arm, with its own school and gorget patches. On 16 May 1953 the speciality adopted the name Signal Speciality and consequently the Connections Battalion "Mantova" was renamed Signal Battalion "Mantova" on 1 June 1953. On 1 March 1954 the battalion was reduced to a company consisting of a command, a command platoon, two Marconists platoons, a signal center platoon, a phone signals platoon. In July 1958 the company was again expanded to battalion and now consisted of a command, a command platoon, and two signal companies.

On 1 October 1975 the Infantry Division "Legnano" was split to form the Mechanized Brigade "Legnano" and Mechanized Brigade "Brescia". On 29 November 1975 the Signal Battalion "Legnano" was disbanded and its personnel and materiel used to form the Command and Services Unit "Legnano".

Recent times 
On 29 September 2004 the 232nd Signal Regiment was formed in Avellino as a projection signal regiment capable to deploy and operate outside Italy. The regiment consisted of a command, a command and services company, and the Battalion "Legnano" with three signal companies. The regiment received the flag and traditions of the 232nd Signal Battalion "Fadalto", as well as the traditions of the Signal Battalion "Legnano". On 1 October 2015 the Battalion Legnano was joined in the regiment by the reformed Battalion "Fadalto".

Current structure 
As of 2022 the Battalion "Legnano" consists of:

 Battalion "Legnano", in Avellino
 1st Signal Company
 2nd Signal Company
 3rd Signal Company

External links
Italian Army Website: 232° Reggimento Trasmissioni

References

Signal Regiments of Italy